Hellmuth Stieff (6 June 1901 – 8 August 1944) was a German general and a member of the OKH (German Army Headquarters) during World War II. He took part in attempts by the German resistance to assassinate Adolf Hitler on 7 and 20 July 1944.

Career
Stieff was born in Deutsch Eylau (now Iława, Poland) in the province of West Prussia. He was graduated from Infanterieschule München of the Reichswehr, the German army after World War I in 1922, and was commissioned a lieutenant of Infantry. As early as 1927, young Stieff served in support of the General Staff .

Stieff joined the Wehrmacht General Staff in 1938, serving in the Organisationsabteilung (coordination department) under Major Adolf Heusinger. Recognized for his excellent organizational skills, Stieff in October 1942 was appointed Chief of Organisation at OKH, despite Hitler's strong personal dislike. Hitler called the young, diminutive Stieff a "poisonous little dwarf."

From the 1939 Invasion of Poland onwards, Stieff conceived an abhorrence for the Nazi military strategy. When in Warsaw in November 1939, he wrote letters to his wife expressing his disgust for and despair over Hitler's conduct of the war and the atrocities committed in occupied Poland. He wrote that he had become the "tool of a despotic will to destroy without regard for humanity and simple decency."

Resistance fighter

Invited by General Henning von Tresckow, Stieff joined the German resistance in summer 1943. Taking advantage of being in charge of Organisationsabteilung, he acquired and kept all sorts of explosives, including some from foreign sources. He provided the explosives for von dem Bussche's canceled assassination attempt on Hitler at the Wolfsschanze (Wolf's Lair) in November.

As one of the officers who had occasional access to Hitler, he volunteered to kill Hitler himself in a suicide attack but later backed away despite repeated requests from Tresckow and Colonel Claus von Stauffenberg to carry out the assassination. On 7 July 1944, during a demonstration of new uniforms to Hitler at Schloss Klessheim, a palace near Salzburg, Stieff was indisposed to trigger the bomb. Stauffenberg, therefore, decided to kill Hitler himself.

In the morning of 20 July, Stieff flew with Stauffenberg and Lieutenant Werner von Haeften in the Heinkel He 111 plane provided by General Eduard Wagner from Berlin to the Wolfsschanze. In the night he was arrested and brutally interrogated under torture by the Gestapo. Stieff held out for several days against all attempts to extract the names of fellow conspirators. Ousted by the Wehrmacht, he was tried by the People's Court (Volksgerichtshof) under President Roland Freisler and sentenced to death on 8 August 1944. At Hitler's personal request, Stieff was executed by hanging in the afternoon of that same day at Plötzensee Prison in Berlin.

See also
 German Resistance

References

External links

 GDW-Biographies
  Biography, Protestant parish Charlottenburg-Nord

1901 births
1944 deaths
People from Iława
Failed assassins of Adolf Hitler
Major generals of the German Army (Wehrmacht)
Reichswehr personnel
Protestants in the German Resistance
People condemned by Nazi courts
Executed members of the 20 July plot
People executed by hanging at Plötzensee Prison
People from West Prussia
Recipients of the Gold German Cross
Executed military leaders
Executed German people
German people executed by Nazi Germany